Dangerously Yours is a 1937 American crime film directed by Malcolm St. Clair and starring Cesar Romero, Phyllis Brooks and Jane Darwell. A detective goes on the track of some jewel thieves, but falls in love with one of the gang. It was a B Movie made by Twentieth Century Fox, with sets designed by the art director Lewis H. Creber.

Partial cast
 Cesar Romero as Victor Morell  
 Phyllis Brooks as Valerie Barton  
 Jane Darwell as Aunt Cynthia Barton 
 Alan Dinehart as Julien Stevens  
 Natalie Garson as Flo Davis  
 John Harrington as Louis Davis  
 Douglas Wood as Walter Chandler  
 Earle Foxe as Eddie  
 Leon Ames as Phil 
 Albert Conti as Monet  
 Leonid Snegoff as Boris

References

Bibliography
 Baugh, Scott L. Latino American Cinema: An Encyclopedia of Movies, Stars, Concepts, and Trends. ABC-CLIO, 2012.

External links
 

1937 films
1937 crime films
American crime films
Films directed by Malcolm St. Clair
20th Century Fox films
American black-and-white films
1930s English-language films
1930s American films